These are the full results of the athletics competition at the 2013 Central American Games which took place between March 9 and March 12, and on March 17, 2013 in San José, Costa Rica.

The following 6 events were cancelled in advance because the required minimum number of inscriptions (athletes representing at least 3 countries) could not be accomplished: men's pole vault, hammer throw, decathlon, 35 km road walk, and women's high jump and pole vault.

Men's results

100 meters

Heat 1 – 9 March – Wind: 0.4 m/s

Heat 2 – 9 March – Wind: 1.3 m/s

Final – 9 March – Wind: -1.5 m/s

200 meters

Heat 1 – 10 March – Wind: 2.2 m/s

Heat 2 – 10 March – Wind: -0.4 m/s

Final – 10 March – Wind: 2.1 m/s

400 meters
Final – 11 March

800 meters
Final – 9 March

1500 meters
Final – 11 March

5000 meters
Final – 10 March

10,000 meters
Final – 12 March

Marathon
Final – 17 March

110 meters hurdles
Final – 12 March – Wind: 2.0 m/s

400 meters hurdles
Final – 9 March

3000 meters steeplechase
Final – 12 March

High jump
Final – 10 March

Long jump
Final – 11 March

Triple jump
Final – 12 March

Shot put
Final – 11 March

Discus throw
Final – 10 March

Javelin throw
Final – 12 March

20 kilometers walk
Final – 9 March

4 x 100 meters relay
Final – 11 March

4 x 400 meters relay
Final – 12 March

Women's results

100 meters
Final – 9 March – Wind: 2.1 m/s

200 meters
Final – 10 March – Wind: 1.2 m/s

400 meters
Final – 11 March

800 meters
Final – 9 March

1500 meters
Final – 11 March

5000 meters
Final – 9 March

10,000 meters
Final – 11 March

Marathon
Final – 17 March

100 meters hurdles
Final – 12 March – Wind: 1.9 m/s

400 meters hurdles
Final – 9 March

3000 meters steeplechase
Final – 12 March

Long jump
Final – 11 March

Triple jump
Final – 12 March

Shot put
Final – 11 March

Discus throw
Final – 10 March

Hammer throw
Final – 9 March

Javelin throw
Final – 12 March

Heptathlon
Final – 9/10 March

20 kilometers walk
Final – 9 March

4 x 100 meters relay
Final – 11 March

4 x 400 meters relay
Final – 12 March

References

Central American Games
2013